The Popular Socialist Party was a political party in Argentina formed in 1972 with the merger of the Argentine Socialist Party, the Movimiento de Acción Popular Argentino (MAPA) and other minor groups.

Headed by the more radical left group of the Party, it became important in particular in the province of Santa Fe, where Guillermo Estévez Boero was elected deputy in 1987, resulting in being the first Socialist parliamentary since Alfredo Palacios' 1965 death. In 1989, the PSP won the second city of the country, Rosario, with the election of Héctor Cavallero (1989–1995), and again with the election of Hermes Binner in 1995 and 2002.

Although Cavallero turned to Carlos Menem and Justicialism, and then founded his own party, Binner became the first Socialist governor of Argentina following the 2007 general elections, being elected in the Province of Santa Fe.

The Movimiento Nacional Reformista (MNR, National Reformist Movement), which is the estudiantine branch of the PSP, has been one of the most representative estudiantine organization since the 1970s, having several times been represented at the presidency or general secretary of the Argentine University Federation (FUA) and of various local federations.

The PSP represented Argentina in the Socialist International and the Latin American Socialist Coordination. In 2002, it merged with the Democratic Socialist Party to form the Socialist Party.

See also
Politics of Argentina
Socialist Party (Argentina)

Socialist parties in Argentina
Defunct political parties in Argentina
Political parties established in 1972
1972 establishments in Argentina
Political parties disestablished in 2002
2002 disestablishments in Argentina
Former member parties of the Socialist International